White Lough, also known as White Lake, is a freshwater lake in the northeast of Ireland. It is located in County Monaghan in the catchment of the River Erne.

Geography

Natural history
Fish species in White Lough include perch, roach, pike, tench and the critically endangered European eel.

See also
List of loughs in Ireland

References

White Lough